The Osijek Oblast was an administrative division of the Kingdom of Serbs, Croats and Slovenes. It existed from 1922 to 1929 and its capital was the city of Osijek.

Oblast elections 
Elections to oblasts were held once on January 23, 1927.

Veliki župan 
The oblast was headed by a veliki župan (Slovenian for "Great mayor"). These were: 
Franjo Gabrek (1922 – 1924)
Ante Perković (1924 – 1925)
Ljudevit Gaj (1925 – 1927)
Radmilo Vujović (1927 – 1928)
Ladislav Hanžeković (1928 – 1929)
Juraj Kučić (1929) 
Ante Perković (1929)

See also 
Osijek-Baranja County

References 

Osijek
History of Slavonia
20th century in Croatia
Oblasts of the Kingdom of Serbs, Croats and Slovenes
Yugoslav Croatia